Sir George Reresby Sitwell, 4th Baronet (27 January 1860 – 9 July 1943) was a British antiquarian writer and Conservative politician who sat in the House of Commons between 1885 and 1895.

Biography
Sitwell was born in London, the son of Sir Sitwell Reresby Sitwell, 3rd Baronet and his wife Louisa Lucy Hutchinson, daughter of the Hon. Henry Hely Hutchinson. His father died in 1862 and he succeeded to the baronetcy at the age of two. He was educated at Eton and Christ Church, Oxford. He was a lieutenant in the West Yorkshire Yeoman Cavalry.

Sitwell contested Scarborough seven times, losing twice in 1884. He was elected Member of Parliament for the constituency at the 1885 general election, but lost it at the 1886 general election. After regaining the seat in the 1892 general election, he lost it again in the 1895 general election.

A keen antiquarian, Sitwell worked on the Sacheverell papers, and wrote a biography of his ancestor, William Sacheverell and published The Letters of the Sitwells and Sacheverells.  His collection of books and papers are said to have filled seven sitting-rooms at the family house, Renishaw Hall, in Derbyshire.  He researched genealogy and heraldry, and was a keen designer of gardens (he studied garden design in Italy).

In 1909 he purchased the Castello di Montegufoni, near Florence, then a wreck inhabited by three hundred peasants. Over the next three decades he restored it to its original design, commissioned the Italian painter Gino Severini to paint the murals, and took up permanent residence there in 1925, writing to the Archbishop of Canterbury and the Chancellor of the Exchequer to explain that taxes had forced him to settle in Italy.

He remained in Italy at the outbreak of war, but in 1942 moved to Switzerland and died at Locarno at the age of 83. He held his baronetcy for 81 years 89 days, longer than all his three predecessors, and one of the longest times anyone has held a baronetcy in England.

Sitwell married, in 1886, Ida Emily Augusta Denison, daughter of William Henry Forester Denison (later 1st Earl of Londesborough). In 1915 he refused to pay off her many creditors, and saw her prosecuted and imprisoned at Holloway for three months. He was succeeded by his elder son Osbert, who described him vividly in his five-volume autobiography.  Sir George's other two children were the writers Edith and Sacheverell Sitwell.

Sitwell was known for his eccentric behaviour. He banned electricity in his household well into the 1940s and made his guests use candles. He deliberately mislabelled his self-medication to stop anyone else using it. Sitwell lived on an exclusive diet of roasted chicken.

Cultural depictions 

 John Gielgud portrayed George Sitwell in a 1990 radio adaptation of Osbert Sitwell's 1962 memoir Tales My Father Taught Me, broadcast on BBC Radio 4 in 1990 and in January 2023 on BBC Radio 4 Extra.

References

External links 
 
 
 Renishaw Hall – History of the Sitwells

1860 births
1943 deaths
Alumni of Christ Church, Oxford
Sitwell, Sir George, 1st Baronet
Conservative Party (UK) MPs for English constituencies
English antiquarians
English biographers
English expatriates in Italy
English expatriates in Switzerland
People educated at Eton College
Politicians from Scarborough, North Yorkshire
George
UK MPs 1885–1886
UK MPs 1892–1895